Lee Sang-yi (born November 27, 1991) is a South Korean actor, musical actor and singer. He is best known for his roles in Once Again (2020), Youth of May (2021), and Hometown Cha-Cha-Cha (2021). As a singer, he is best known for being a member of the vocal group MSG Wannabe.

Early life and education 
Lee Sang-yi first came across acting when he did an English play in 6th grade in elementary school. In 2008, when he was student at Anyang Arts High School, he covered Rain's Rainism dance and won 1st place in the UCC contest. He went on to study acting at Korea National University of Arts.

Career 
Lee Sang-yi made his debut in 2014 with the musical "Grease". Later in 2017, he made his first television appearance when he joined the cast of the drama Manhole and portrayed Oh Dal-soo. In November of the same year he featured in the Prison Playbook series.

On March 28, 2020, he starred in the weekend drama Once Again, in which he played dentist Yoon Jae-suk. With the drama's success, he gained tremendous popularity among viewers and received a lot of love for his role that became known as the national in-law.

In May 2021, he joined the cast of the Youth of May. And also on May, 2021, Lee was revealed as one of the MSG Wannabe members who passed on variety show program Hangout with Yoo and debuted as a member of MSG Wannabe and was part of the sub-unit JSDK. In June 2021, he was confirmed to star in the tvN drama Hometown Cha-Cha-Cha in which he portrayed Ji Sung-hyun, a workaholic variety show director who has a bright personality. At the end of 2021, Lee became an MC for the 2021 MBC Entertainment Awards with Jun Hyun-moo and Kim Se-jeong.

Filmography

Film

Television series

Web series

Television show

Hosting

Music video

Stage

Musical

Theater

Discography

Soundtrack appearances

With MSG Wannabe

Awards and nominations

References

External links 
 Lee Sang-yi at PLK Good Friends 
 
 
 
 Lee Sang-yi at Daum Encyclopedia 
 Lee Sang-yi at PlayDB 
 Lee Sang-yi at Naver 

1991 births
Living people
People from Ansan
21st-century South Korean male actors
South Korean male musical theatre actors
South Korean male actors
South Korean male film actors
South Korean male television actors
Korea National University of Arts alumni
Anyang Arts High School alumni